Morgan Alfie Roberts (born 07 November 2000) is a Welsh professional footballer who plays as a winger for Aldershot Town on loan from Swindon Town.

Club career
Roberts joined Northampton Town's youth academy in 2009, after beginning at Northampton Soccer Stars, prior to being promoted into the first-team squad nine years later. Roberts was an unused substitute for an EFL League One match with Blackpool in April 2018, which preceded his professional debut on 5 May during a 2–2 draw at Sixfields Stadium with Oldham Athletic; the club's 2017–18 finale as they suffered relegation. He signed a new contract with Northampton on 17 May.

On 11 October 2019, Roberts headed off on loan to AFC Rushden & Diamonds of the Southern League. He won man of the match in two of his first three appearances for them. He scored his first senior goal on 22 October, netting against Banbury United; a team he would later join. Roberts made a second one-month loan move of the season to a Southern League Premier Central team, this time in the shape of Banbury United on 12 November 2019; joining up with brother Connor. On 12 December 2020, Roberts joined National League North team Brackley Town on loan for a month.

On 7 July 2021, Roberts rejoined former club Banbury United on a permanent deal. The 2021–22 season saw success for Banbury as they were promoted to the sixth tier of English football for the first time in their history.

On 1 September 2022, Roberts returned to the Football League when he joined EFL League Two club Swindon Town. The move came after an impressive opening month of the season that saw Roberts saw four goals, ultimately being awarded the National League North Player of the Month award for August 2022. In February 2023, Roberts signed for National League club Aldershot Town on loan until the end of the season.

International career
Roberts was called up to a training camp with the Wales U21s in March 2019.

Personal life
He attended Kingsthorpe Grove and Northampton School for Boys as a pupil. His father, Gareth, is a former semi-professional footballer, while brother Connor is a current footballer.

Career statistics
.

Notes

Honours
Banbury United
Southern Football League Premier Division Central Champions: 2021–22

Individual
National League North Player of the Month: August 2022

References

External links

Profile at Aylesbury United

2000 births
Living people
Footballers from Northampton
English footballers
English people of Welsh descent
Association football midfielders
English Football League players
Southern Football League players
National League (English football) players
Northampton Town F.C. players
AFC Rushden & Diamonds players
Banbury United F.C. players
Brackley Town F.C. players
Swindon Town F.C. players
Aldershot Town F.C. players